Helena Kantakouzene (1333 – 10 December 1396) was the Empress consort of John V Palaiologos in the Byzantine Empire.

Life 
She was a daughter of John VI Kantakouzenos and Irene Asanina; Donald Nicol believes she was the youngest of their three daughters. She was a sister of Matthew Kantakouzenos and Manuel Kantakouzenos. Her sisters Maria and Theodora were the respective wives of Nikephoros II Orsini and Orhan I.

John V and John VI were rival emperors in a civil war fought from 1341 to 1347. The two sides at last reached an agreement. According to its terms John VI would be recognized as senior co-emperor with John V as his junior. The peace was sealed with the marriage of Helena to John V.

The marriage occurred on 28 May 1347 – 29 May 1347, on the eighth day after her father's coronation by the Patriarch Isidore. Helena was about thirteen years old while her groom was a month short of his fifteenth birthday. Peace only lasted until 1352 when her husband resumed hostilities against her father. John VI was forced to resign the throne on 4 December 1354. Her brother Matthew would retain his title as co-emperor until his own defeat in 1357.

Previous to her marriage, Helena had accompanied her mother and sister to Selymbria for the wedding of her sister Theodora to the Ottoman Emir Orhan in 1346. Shortly after her own wedding, Orhan sent an agent to Constantinople to assassinate her husband, thinking he was doing John VI Kantakouzenos a favor. In 1352 Helena accompanied with her husband and her younger son Manuel to Thrace to accept control of the cities John VI had allotted him. Nicephorus Gregoras claims she later went to Constantinople to protect her father from possible actions by her husband, who had joined the anti-Palamite cause.

When her son Andronikos IV deposed his father 12 August 1376 in the struggle of the ongoing civil war, Helena tried to reconcile the two parties. Despite her efforts, John V and his sons Theodore and Manuel were put in prison October of that year. When the three escaped from prison in June 1379, she was thought responsible for it. Andronikos IV then fled to Galata, taking with him as hostages Helena, her elderly father John VI, and her two sisters Maria and Theodora. There the four were kept in strict confinement and suffered increasing privation during the siege of the fortress of Galata. They were released after John V and Andronikos signed a treaty in May 1381, and according to Demetrios Kydones, received a tumultuous welcome from the people of Constantinople.

After John V died in 1391, Helena became a nun in the convent of Kyra Martha in Constantinople, adopting the name of Hypomone. Nicol suggests she took up her vocation after July 1392, for there is evidence that she was still taking an active part in the affairs of state at that time. She died in 1396, sometime between October and December.

Family 
Helena and John V had at least eleven children— five sons and at least six daughters. These known children include:
Andronikos IV Palaiologos (2 April 1348 – 28 June 1385);
Irene Palaiologina (c. 1349 – after 1362), who married her first cousin Khalil of Bithynia. Her husband was a son of Orhan I and Helena's sister Theodora Kantakouzene. The couple had two sons, Prince Gunduz and Prince Omer.
Manuel II Palaiologos (27 June 1350 – 21 July 1425);
Theodore I Palaiologos, Lord of Morea (c. 1355 – 24 June 1407);
Michael Palaiologos (d. 1376/1377), who claimed the throne of the Empire of Trebizond from Alexios III;
Maria Palaiologina, married Murad I;
One daughter betrothed to Peter II of Cyprus, who may not be Irene or Maria;
An unnamed daughter reported to have entered a monastery in 1373, who may be different women from the ones listed above.
An unnamed daughter who married Bayezid I, son of Murad I;
An unnamed daughter who married Yakub Çelebi, son of Murad I.

Depictions in fiction

A fictionalised form of her character features prominently in the novel Adora by Bertrice Small, published 1980.

References

Sources

Further reading 
 Frances Kianka, "The Letters of Demetrios Kydones to Empress Helena Kantakouzene Palaiologina", Dumbarton Oaks Papers: Homo Byzantinus: Papers in Honor of Alexander Kazhdan, 46 (1992), pp. 155–164

1333 births
1396 deaths
14th-century Byzantine empresses
Helena
Helena
Daughters of Byzantine emperors
Mothers of Byzantine emperors